Stevens Point is the county seat of Portage County, Wisconsin, United States.  The city was incorporated in 1858.

Its 2020 population of 25,666 makes it the largest city in the county. Stevens Point forms the core of the United States Census Bureau's Stevens Point Micropolitan Statistical Area, which had a 2020 population of 70,377

Stevens Point is home to the University of Wisconsin–Stevens Point and a campus of Mid-State Technical College.

History
Historically part of the Menominee homelands, a three-mile strip along the Wisconsin River was ceded to the United States in an 1836 treaty. In 1854 the Menominee made its last treaty with the U.S., gathering on a reservation on the Wolf River. In the Menominee language it is called Pasīpahkīhnen which means "It juts out as land" or "point of land".

Stevens Point was named after George Stevens, who operated a grocery and supply business on the Wisconsin River during the extensive logging of interior Wisconsin. The river was used by logging companies to float logs to market. Loggers on the river found this a convenient stopping point, as the river bends slightly and the operation was from far upstream. The town developed from Stevens's post and was named for him.

In 1845, the postal service came to Stevens Point and with this improvement in communications, the population tripled within 20 years.

In 1847, the first plat was laid out of what became the City of Stevens Point, including the Public Square. The town square was originally an area next to the Wisconsin River where professionals, craftsmen, businessmen, and loggers gathered before their river journeys, bringing revenue to the area. As years went by, the area around the town square grew as logging increased.

Most buildings were first built with readily available wood. Many cases of early fires were reported from 1850–1890. Around 1880, buildings began to be built of brick and sandstone.

Geography
According to the United States Census Bureau, the city encompasses , including  of land  of water. The communities of Plover, Whiting and Park Ridge are adjacent to the city. The city's main hydrology includes the Wisconsin River to the west and the Plover River, which joins the Wisconsin from the northeast at a point to the south, and which supplies much of the urban area's water.

Climate

Demographics

2020 census
As of the census of 2020, the population was 25,666. The racial makeup of the city was 85.6% White, 4.8% Asian, 2.7% Black or African American, 0.6% Native American, 1.3% from other races, and 4.9% from two or more races. Ethnically, the population was 4.1% Hispanic or Latino of any race.

The 2020 census population of the city included 40 people incarcerated in adult correctional facilities and 2,595 people in student housing.

According to American Community Survey estimates for 2016-20, the median income for a household in the city was $46,663, and the median income for a family was $73,009. Male full-time workers had a median income of $48,618 versus $32,409 for female workers. The per capita income was $26,127. About 7.0% of families and 19.3% of the population were below the poverty line, including 11.4% of those under 18 and 8.6% of those 65 or older. Of the population 25 and older, 93.4% were high school graduates or higher and 38.1% had a bachelor's degree or higher.

2010 census
As of the 2010 census 26,717 people, 10,598 households, and 4,944 families residing in the city. The racial makeup of the city was 91.7% White, 0.9% African American, 0.4% Native American, 4.7% Asian, 0.7% from other races, and 1.5% from two or more races. Hispanic or Latino of any race was 2.6% of the population.

Among households, 21.7% had children under the age of 18, 34.9% were married couples living together, 8.5% had a female householder with no husband present, 3.2% had a male householder with no wife present, and 53.3% were non-families. 34.9% of all households were made up of individuals, and 11.2% had someone living alone who was 65 years of age or older. The average household size was 2.21 and the average family size was 2.87.

The median age in the city was 26.5 years. 16% of residents were under the age of 18; 31.3% were between the ages of 18 and 24; 22.3% were from 25 to 44; 18.5% were from 45 to 64; and 12% were 65 years of age or older. The gender makeup of the city was 48.8% male and 51.2% female.

Education

The Stevens Point Area Public School District serves the city, as do the Pacelli Catholic Schools and Point of Discovery School.

Public elementary schools include Bannach, Jefferson School for the Arts, Kennedy, Madison, McDill, McKinley, Roosevelt, Plover-Whiting, and Washington Service-Learning Center. There are two junior high schools, Ben Franklin and P. J. Jacobs, and two high schools, Stevens Point Area Senior High (SPASH) and Charles F. Fernandez Center for Alternative Learning.

Parochial schools include St. Paul Lutheran School (Pre-K–8), St. Joseph Early Childhood Center, St. Stanislaus (K–2) and St. Stephen Elementary (3–5) Schools, St. Peter Middle School, and Pacelli High School.

The city serves as the hub of the Portage County Public Library, which provides educational resources and programming for adults, young adults and children.

Stevens Point is home to the University of Wisconsin–Stevens Point (UWSP). The university enrolls approximately 9,500 students in undergraduate and graduate degree programs. Mid-State Technical College (MSTC) is also in the city.

Transportation

Major highways

Five major roads pass through Stevens Point:

  Northbound I-39 routes to Wausau. Southbound, it routes to Madison and Bloomington.
  travels east to Manitowoc and Bay City and west to Fargo.
  Northbound US 51 routes to Hurley. Southbound, US 51 routes to Baton Rouge, Louisiana.
  travels east to Green Bay and west to Onalaska.
  travels east to Rosholt and west to Wisconsin Rapids.

Airport

The city is served by two airports. Commercial service is available through Central Wisconsin Airport (KCWA), midway between Stevens Point and Wausau, near Mosinee. CWA is served by three major airlines. General aviation, charter flights and air cargo operators use the Stevens Point Municipal Airport (KSTE).

Public transit

Stevens Point Transit system provides public transportation.

Religion
The mother house of the Sisters of St. Joseph of the Third Order of St. Francis was in Stevens Point. Catholic parishes in the city include Holy Spirit, St. Stephen, St. Casimir, St. Peter, and St. Joseph. Lutheran and other Protestant churches are also present, along with members of the Baháʼí Faith.

A wide variety of Catholic and Protestant churches spread throughout Stevens Point. Many of those churches date back to the early 20th century. Within the past century, other religious groups have made their mark on Stevens Point.

Economy 

Major employers in the area include Pixelle Specialty Paper paper mill, Associated Banc-Corp, Sentry Insurance, Travel Guard (travel and insurance), Donaldson Company, Skyward (software design), Lands' End, Canadian National Railway, Delta Dental of Wisconsin, Worzalla Publishing, Mason Companies (formerly known as Figis), Berkshire Hathaway Travel Protection, Herrschners, and the Stevens Point Brewery.

Companies with corporate headquarters in the city include Sentry Insurance, Ki Mobility, Delta Dental of Wisconsin, and Skyward. Associated Bank, Canadian National, AIG, and the Donaldson Company have regional headquarters in Stevens Point.

Business developments in the area include Crossroads Commons, Portage County Business Park, Venture Drive and Corporate Center, Stevens Point Industrial Park, Eastridge, Parkdale Plazas, Stevens Points East Side and Downtown Stevens Point.

At one time, Midstate Airlines had its headquarters in Stevens Point.

Culture 

Stevens Point is home to a community theater group, Central Wisconsin Area Community Theatre (cwACT); a children's museum; and a group of museums run by the Portage County Historical Society, including the Beth Israel Congregation Museum, in the former synagogue. (The synagogue has been defunct since 1985.)

Religion plays a significant role in the community. In 1847, the first recorded religious service was held near the town square with a pastor from Norway. As time went by, more religions joined the town square, and by 1900, Catholic, Lutheran, and Methodist churches and Jewish synagogues were established within one mile of the downtown area.

The Central Wisconsin Symphony Orchestra (CWSO) presents four concerts each season.

Most events happen near the downtown area, many at the town square, which was rebuilt in 2011. These include the annual Riverfront Rendezvous, Corn on the Curb, sculpture park summer celebration, Fourth of July parade, Krazy Days and Gather at the River.

The downtown area was designated a "Wisconsin Main Street Community" and offers specialty shops and restaurants. Buildings in downtown Stevens Point are made from materials including Lake Superior limestone, brick, and red granite. City and county administrative offices are downtown, as are a bank regional headquarters and two insurance companies. Downtown also offers night life on "the Square" that is popular with college students and a farmers' market that has been selling fresh produce for over 100 years. The farmers' market is open early summer through early fall.

Stevens Point hosts the world's largest trivia contest, run by UWSP's radio station, WWSP-FM. The contest, which typically involves over 12,000 contestants on more than 400 teams, is held every year in April and lasts 54 consecutive hours, from Friday to Sunday.

The city was the setting for the first three seasons of the Disney Channel series Liv and Maddie.

Recreation
The area hosts 20 developed parks and a  bicycle and jogging trail (the Green Circle Trail) that surrounds and winds through the city. The Ice Age National Scenic Trail also runs through the city. An 18-hole Robert Trent Jones, Jr.-designed golf course and country club, SentryWorld, is at the Sentry Insurance Home Office. The Schmeeckle Reserve, a nature reserve, is on the University of Wisconsin–Stevens Point campus. Right outside of Schmeeckle is the Stevens Point Sculpture Park, which displays sculpture by local artists. 

The area also has Goerke Park, which includes a football stadium where high school and college athletes compete. An outdoor track is used by the same groups.

The Backwaters Paddle Quest canoe adventure challenge has been held in Stevens Point on the Wisconsin River since 2002, usually during the second week of August. Players paddle their crafts over two days past checkpoints along the river, encountering characters who act out a storyline that continues year to year.

Iverson Park is a recreational park course that lies on the green circle trail and Plover River in Stevens Point. It spans over 100 acres, and contains a swimming area, hiking trails, and canoe and recreation activities rental.

City rankings
Stevens Point was listed in Relocate-America's Top 10 Best Places to Live in 2007 and 2008 for the United States and listed in the Top 100 for 2003, 2004, 2007, 2008, 2009 and 2010. It was listed in the Top Ten Recreation cities in America in 2010. In 2009 CNNMoney.com ranked Stevens Point the 18th best place to retire. The magazine stated that there was "plenty for retirees to do in the summertime" as well as the winter, including hiking, biking and skiing the Green Circle Trail.

Notable people 

 Cole Caufield, NHL player
 Pat Friday, baseball executive for the Kansas City Athletics
 Suzy Favor Hamilton, middle distance runner, NCAA champion, 3-time Olympian
 Sam Hauser, NBA player
 Joel Hodgson, writer, comedian, and actor; creator of Mystery Science Theater 3000
 Ian Holland, first class cricketer for Victoria cricket team, and Hampshire County Cricket Club
 Kathy Kinney, actress and comedian
 Ben Kissel, co-host of The Last Podcast on the Left
 Ross Kolodziej, NFL player and coach
 Janel McCarville, WNBA player
 Harry McCurdy, Major League Baseball catcher
 James Miller, Catholic teacher and missionary
 Ben Provisor, Olympic wrestler
 Ryan Ramczyk, NFL player
 Rick Reichardt, former MLB player
 Patrick Rothfuss, author
 Chris Solinsky, NCAA champion distance runner
 Garrett Weber-Gale (born 1985), Olypmic swimmer
 Peter Weller, actor, director, and art historian
 Chet Yorton, professional bodybuilder

Sister cities 
Gulcz, Greater Poland Voivodeship, Poland
Rostov Veliky, Yaroslavl Oblast, Russia

See also 
 Linwood Springs Research Station

References

External links 

 City of Stevens Point
 Stevens Point Area Convention & Visitors Bureau

 
Micropolitan areas of Wisconsin
County seats in Wisconsin
Cities in Portage County, Wisconsin
Populated places established in 1858
1858 establishments in Wisconsin
Academic enclaves
Cities in Wisconsin